The Tenente Marques River is a river of Rondônia and Mato Grosso states in western Brazil.

It was initially known as the Ananaz River, which was named by Cândido Rondon after a pineapple field that had encountered while exploring the area, but was later named after the explorer Tenente Marques after his death.

See also
List of rivers of Rondônia
List of rivers of Mato Grosso

References

Brazilian Ministry of Transport

Rivers of Rondônia
Rivers of Mato Grosso